The Mallet Assembly is an intellectual living program at the University of Alabama in Tuscaloosa, Alabama. Mallet was established in 1961 by John Blackburn.

The Mallet Assembly takes its name from the fact that it was originally housed in a building known as Mallet Hall, which no longer exists. Mallet Hall itself was named for John Mallet, head of the Central Ordnance Laboratory of the Confederate Nitre Bureau. The group  occupied Byrd Hall from 1972-2007, then Palmer Hall until 2014, and is now located in Highlands Building C.

The Mallet Assembly is one of the few self-governing dormitories in the US; much of its internal operation is coordinated by elected student officers.  Mallet is listed by the University of Alabama Office of Residential Life as a Special Living-Learning option, and is also a member of the Coordinating Council for Student Organizations (CCSO).

The Assembly was traditionally a men's residence. Although they accepted applications from female students since 1980, women were admitted as "out of dorm" members (although some women Malleteers were able to reside in the building during summer semesters). In 2007, Mallet became a co-ed living option with men and women living in the same building.

In 2011, the 50th anniversary of the Assembly was honored in a resolution of the Alabama House of Representatives. 

Notable Mallet alumni include:

 Mark Childress, author of  Crazy in Alabama
 Kittyhawk, author of Sparkling Generation Valkyrie Yuuki
 Alexander Sotirov, computer security researcher

Honorary members include:

Brandon Bird, artist, gave a Mallet-sponsored talk on September 27, 2007
William Shatner, actor, gave a University-sponsored talk in 2000

References 
Citations

Other sources

External links 
 

University of Alabama